Victor Apollinaire Bartolomei von Schirach-Szmigiel (born 24 May 1984), known professionally as Victor von Schirach, is a Swedish actor, director and producer from Stockholm, Sweden.

Career
After attending several smaller drama institutes, he graduated from The Academy of Music and Drama at the Gothenburg University in 2012. Von Schirach got his breakthrough in 2011 with the popular TV-series Elsa's World as the flamboyant Johan, one of the main characters. The show was seen by 1.4 million Swedish viewers.

In 2012 von Schirach played the main character Janne in the Swedish feature film Aerobics - A Love Story directed by Anders Rune and in the upcoming sequel of the Swedish TV series The Bridge which was nominated for a BAFTA award for Best International Television Series.

Filmography 
Cinema appearances 

 Television appearances

References

External links

Living people
1984 births
Swedish male film actors
Swedish male television actors
Male actors from Stockholm